This is a list of symphonies by the classical composer Wolfgang Amadeus Mozart. Symphonies No. 2 (attributed to Leopold Mozart) and 3 (written by Carl Friedrich Abel) are spurious. Mozart's "37th symphony" is actually Michael Haydn's 25th symphony; Mozart only added a 20-bar slow introduction to it. Symphonies that are suspected not to be Mozart's, but have not been proven to be the work of another composer, are in this list. No. 11 (K. 84/73q) is considered by scholars to be of uncertain authenticity. Spurious and doubtful symphonies can be found at Mozart symphonies of spurious or doubtful authenticity.

The symphonies K. 19b, 66c, 66d, 66e, Anh.C 11.07, and Anh.C 11.08 are lost, and it is uncertain whether they are Mozart's work: they have not been included in the list below.

The symphony numbers in the range 42 to 56 are sometimes used for symphonic works that were not numbered in the 1-41 sequence. They have been included for completeness, although they are out of chronological sequence. In addition, some authentic symphonies were never given numbers. The symphonies in the 1-41 chronological sequence have been listed first; the symphonies that were given the numbers 42-56 are listed next; and lastly are listed the remaining symphonies. The symphonies given numbers past 41 (but not No. 7a) are sometimes listed with "GA" preceding the number, because these numbers were from the 
Alte Mozart-Ausgabe, the full name of which was the "Wolfgang Amadeus Mozarts Werke: Kritisch durchgesehene Gesamtausgabe". There are no symphonies "GA 49" and "GA 53".

Links to scores of each symphony have been included. All the symphonies in this table except Nos. 2, 3 and 37 (which are spurious) have links to scores in the Neue Mozart-Ausgabe; the spurious symphonies Nos. 2, 3 and 37 have links to scores at the International Music Score Library Project.

List of symphonies
: Outside of original 41

Adapted from serenades

Uncertain authenticity

Doubtful authenticity

Spurious authenticity

See also
Mozart symphonies of spurious or doubtful authenticity
List of compositions by Wolfgang Amadeus Mozart

Notes

 
Lists of symphonies by composer
Symphonies